Khanpur–Chachran Railway was one of several branch lines in Pakistan, operated and maintained by Pakistan Railways. The line began at Khanpur Junction and ended at Chachran.

History
The branch line was initially referred to as the Bahawalpur Royal Railway and was a Darbar line financed by the Princely Bahawalpur State. The line opened in 1911 as part of the North Western State Railway network. The line was owned by the Bahawalpur State Darbar, who also owned the Bahawalnagar–Fort Abbas Railway. Following Pakistan's independence, the line became part of the Pakistan Railways network. The line linked Khanpur and Chachran.

Stations
 Khanpur Junction
 Kotla Pathan
 Jajja Abbasian
 Zahir Pir
 Chachran

See also
 Samasata-Amruka Branch Line
 Mandra–Bhaun Railway
 Karachi–Peshawar Railway Line
 Railway lines in Pakistan

References

Closed railway lines in Pakistan
Railway lines opened in 1911
Railway stations on Khanpur–Chachran Railway